The Iranian identity card is the primary identity document in Iran. Every citizen age of 15 and above, whether resident or not, needs to apply for such a card, which bears their unique national identity number, given name, surname, birth date, and postal code. The current version of this card is called the national smart card and is the successor of the national card. This card is intended to reduce the need for the more valuable Iranian identity booklet, which is issued at birth.

The National Organization For Civil Registration began issuing national smart cards in 2015. At the time, the application was voluntary. As with other smart cards, the national card features a smart chip and an RFID. The Iranian authorities initially advertised this card as a means of secure participation in elections that guarantees voting integrity.

Smart national card program
The materiel required for development was unavailable 
The shortage halted the program halfway caused the replacement national scheme to be a failure. Only 10 million cards issued after 7 years.

See also
 Iranian passport
 Identity documents in Iran

References

External links

Government of Iran
Iran
Authentication methods in Iran
Identity documents of Iran